
South Camp Prison, also known as the Gun Court prison, opened in 1974 as a combined court and prison to combat the increase in violent crimes involving firearms.  A single resident magistrate can issue prison sentences to those convicted of illegal possession of firearms or ammunition. It has accommodated over 330 inmates on occasions.

It is operated by the Department of Correctional Services for the Ministry of National Security.

See also

List of prisons in Jamaica

External links
Aerial view.
Photos:

References

Prisons in Jamaica
Buildings and structures in Kingston, Jamaica
Military of Jamaica
1974 establishments in Jamaica